Stefan Kisyov is a novelist, journalist, playwright and short story writer.  Kisyov was born in Stara Zagora in 1963. He studied at Sofia and Plovdiv universities, and also at the Sorbonne in Paris. He has worked as an electrician at a tram depot, locksmith at a chemical factory, administrator at a Black Sea hotel, stage hand at the Stara Zagora Opera, waiter, newspaper journalist and in television. He lived in France and Switzerland. He is the author of books such as Jukebox, Not a Thing Anywhere, Don't Wake the Somnambulist, Your Name is Woman and A Waiter in the Boyana Residence. His award-winning novel, The Executioner was published in 2003. 
Stefan Kisyov lives in Havana.

Works

Stefan Kisyov's novels 
 Juke-box (1996)
 Nothing Anywhere (2000)
 Don't Wake Up the Sleepwalker (2000)
 The Executioner, winner of   the Vick Foundation's  "Best Novel of 2004"  Era (publisher)
 A Waiter at Boyana Residence (2004)
 Thy name is a woman (2007) Era (publisher)
 The Voyeur and the Tenant (2008) Era (publisher)
 The Mystery of the Knight Capulet (2011) Era (publisher)

Short stories
Kisyov has written over 100 short stories in influential newspapers and magazines and many non-fictional pieces.

 Play 
 Desperadoes'' (1999)

References

Bulgarian novelists
Male novelists
Bulgarian male writers
Living people
1963 births
20th-century Bulgarian novelists
21st-century Bulgarian novelists